Hilarographa renonga is a species of moth of the family Tortricidae. It is found in Thailand.

The wingspan is about 10 mm. The ground colour of the forewings is creamy in form of fine lines extending from the dorsum to the subcostal area, three lines from the costa and indistinct basal strips. The posterior third of the wings is orange. The hindwings are brown.

Etymology
The name refers to the type locality.

References

Moths described in 2009
Hilarographini